Life with an Idiot is an opera by the Russian composer Alfred Schnittke to a Russian libretto by Viktor Erofeyev. Written as an allegory of oppression under the Soviet Union, the opera was first performed at Het Muziektheater, Amsterdam, on 13 April 1992.

Roles

Synopsis
Act 1 As a punishment for not working hard enough, "I" is forced by the authorities to live with an idiot. He chooses Vova from a lunatic asylum. Vova is only capable of speaking a single word: "Ech".

Act 2 At first Vova behaves well but then he suddenly begins to make a nuisance of himself, including tearing up I's wife's copy of the works of Marcel Proust. I and his wife go to live in another room and Vova calms down. I's wife falls in love with Vova and becomes pregnant by him. Then Vova and I turn on the wife. Vova kills her and I becomes an idiot.

Recordings
Life with an Idiot (live recording of premiere cast), Rotterdam Philharmonic Orchestra, conducted by Rostropovich (Sony)

References

Further reading
The Viking Opera Guide, ed. Amanda Holden (Viking, 1993).
Del Teatro (in Italian).

Operas by Alfred Schnittke
1992 operas
Operas
Russian-language operas
Works about the Soviet Union